Roubini Global Economics (RGE), was a small economic consultancy for financial analysis.

History
Roubini Global Economics was founded in 2004 by Nouriel Roubini, former senior adviser in the U.S. Treasury and to the International Monetary Fund and a professor at New York University's Stern School of Business, and Camille LeBlanc, a serial entrepreneur in the digital media sector. LeBlanc was the founding CEO, and was responsible for building the initial team and seeding the product in 3,000 accounts in the public and private financial sector. The company re-branded itself as Roubini Global Economics in 2010. 

As of 2011, the firm was not profitable. Roubini said: "The most important thing in this kind of business is that you have to be right day in and day out. The fact that I made a right call a few years ago doesn’t matter." In July 2012, RGE announced that it had acquired Country Insights. 

Roubini closed the firm in 2016.

Footnotes

Financial services companies established in 2004
Financial services companies disestablished in 2016
Companies based in New York (state)
Defunct research and analysis firms
Research and analysis firms of the United States